The 2020 Four Continents Short Track Speed Skating Championships were the inaugural Four Continents Short Track Speed Skating Championships and held from 11 to 12 January 2020 in Montreal, Canada. Skaters from eight different countries (Canada, China, Colombia, Japan, the Philippines, Singapore, South Korea, United States) competed, of which South Korea was the most successful team, winning the gold medal all ten events.

Medal summary

Medal table

Men's events

Women's events

References

External links
 Official website 
Results book

Four Continents
Four Continents Short Track Speed Skating Championships
International speed skating competitions hosted by Canada
Sports competitions in Montreal
Four Continents Short Track Speed Skating Championships